Oedipus Judaicus by William Drummond was first published in 1811 in a limited edition of 200 copies. The book was originally intended for use in a scholastic setting in an attempt to protect Drummond's political career from ridicule.

The work is a commentary on a supposed astrological allegory in the Old Testament of the Bible, patterned after the Oedipus Aegyptiacus of Kircher. In the book, Drummond seeks possible sources of the Biblical writings, from the Temple of Denderah to parallels with the Roman gods, dealing primarily with the 49th chapter of Genesis and the book of Joshua to draw his conclusions.

The book was reprinted in 1866 and again in 1986, and is again in print.

External articles and references
 The Oedipus Judaicus. Entire text at Google Books

1811 non-fiction books
Religious studies books
Astrological texts
Books about the Bible